Enfield may refer to:

Places

Australia 
 Enfield, New South Wales
 Enfield, South Australia
 Electoral district of Enfield, a state electoral district in South Australia, corresponding to the suburb
 Enfield High School (South Australia)
 Enfield, Victoria

Canada 
 Enfield, Nova Scotia
 Rural Municipality of Enfield No. 194, Saskatchewan

England

Greater London 
Enfield, London, a town in the ceremonial county of Greater London
Enfield Chase
Enfield F.C.
Enfield Highway
Enfield Lock
Enfield poltergeist, a claim of supernatural activity between 1977 and 1979
Enfield Town, the historic centre of Enfield, chartered as a market town in 1303
Enfield-chantry school, chantry school in Enfield from circa 1398–1558, and the predecessor of Enfield Grammar School
Enfield County School, girls' comprehensive school, established 1909
Enfield Grammar School, boys' secondary school, established 1558
Enfield Town F.C., a breakaway football club from Enfield FC, established in 2001
St Andrew's Enfield, the church of the ancient parish of Enfield
Enfield Wash
Enfield East (UK Parliament constituency), House of Commons constituency between 1950 and 1974
Enfield North (UK Parliament constituency), House of Commons constituency since 1974
Enfield Southgate (UK Parliament constituency), House of Commons constituency since 1950
Enfield (UK Parliament constituency), House of Commons constituency between 1885 and 1950
Enfield West (UK Parliament constituency), House of Commons constituency between 1950 and 1974
London Borough of Enfield, local authority district since 1965
Municipal Borough of Enfield, local authority district covering the ancient parish of Enfield between 1850 and 1965

Lancashire 

 Enfield Cricket Club, a Lancashire League cricket team

Worcestershire 

 Enfield, Worcestershire, a district of Redditch named after the former Royal Enfield headquarters

Ireland 
 Enfield, County Meath, a small town

United States 
 Enfield, Connecticut
 Enfield High School
 Enfield, Illinois
 Enfield, Maine
 Enfield, Massachusetts, former town
 Enfield, New Hampshire, a town
 Enfield (CDP), New Hampshire, a village and census-designated place in the town
 Enfield, New York
 Enfield, North Carolina

Military 
 Enfield revolver
 Lee–Enfield, magazine rifle
 M1917 Enfield, rifle
 Pattern 1853 Enfield, rifle musket
 Royal Small Arms Factory, Enfield
 Snider–Enfield, a breech-loading rifle

People 
 Enfield (surname), list of people with this name

Other uses 
 Enfield (heraldry)
 Royal Enfield, the brand of the Enfield Cycle Company, an English engineering company which made motorcycles
Royal Enfield (India), an Indian motorcycle company using the British Royal Enfield brand
 Enfield Automotive
 Enfield 8000
 Enfield Tennis Academy, a fictional Boston-area sports academy in David Foster Wallace's novel Infinite Jest
 Enfield Formation, a rock unit in New York

See also 
 EN postcode area
 Enfield station (disambiguation)